Fajar Setya Jaya (born 17 November 1995) is an Indonesian professional footballer who plays as a goalkeeper for Liga 2 club Kalteng Putra.

Club career

Persik Kediri
He was signed for Persik Kediri to play in Liga 2 in the 2019 season. On 25 November 2019 Persik successfully won the 2019 Liga 2 Final and promoted to Liga 1, after defeated Persita Tangerang 3–2 at the Kapten I Wayan Dipta Stadium, Gianyar.

PSIS Semarang
PSIS Semarang officially introduced goalkeeper Fajar Setya Jaya to strengthen the team ahead of the 2022–23 Liga 1 competition. Fajar Setya himself admitted that he was happy with his return to the Laskar Mahesa Jenar squad this year. The 26-year-old player previously played for PSIS in 2016-2017 before moving on.

Career statistics

Club

Honours

Club 
Persik Kediri
 Liga 2: 2019

References

External links
 Fajar Setya Jaya at Soccerway

1995 births
Living people
Indonesian footballers
Liga 2 (Indonesia) players
Liga 1 (Indonesia) players
PSIS Semarang players
Persiba Balikpapan players
Persik Kediri players
Kalteng Putra F.C. players
Association football goalkeepers
People from Semarang
Sportspeople from Central Java